Salah Ebrahim Hassan Al-Jezoli (born 14 September 1985) is Sudanese professional footballer who plays as a defender or midfielder. He played at the 2014 FIFA World Cup qualification.

International goals

References

External links 
 
 

1985 births
Living people
Sudanese footballers
Sudan international footballers
Association football defenders
Association football midfielders
Al Khartoum SC players
Al-Hilal Club (Omdurman) players
Al-Hilal SC (Kadougli) players
Hay Al-Arab SC players